Conducting from the Grave is the third and final studio album by the American deathcore band, Conducting from the Grave. It is their only self-released album, since they decided to leave Sumerian Records in 2013, as well as the only one to feature clean vocals.

Track listing

Credits
Conducting from the Grave
Mikey Powell – lead vocals 
Greg Donnelly – drums 
Jackson Jordan – bass guitar 
John Abernathy – guitar 
Jeff Morgan – guitar 
Additional personnel
Jacob Durrett – guitar tracking
Zack Ohren – engineering, mastering, mixing
Mikey Powell – Vocal tracking, processing

References

2013 albums
Conducting from the Grave albums
Self-released albums